The snouted harvester termite (Trinervitermes biformis) is a species of mound building termite in the genus Trinervitermes, native to India and Sri Lanka. The type species was described from the Bandarawela area of Sri Lanka. It is a pest of sugarcane and brinjal.

References

External links
Trinervitermes Biformis (Wasmann), a Mound Building Termite in South India
Bioecological and economical observations on termites of Peninsular India
Studies on the development of captive termite colonies
Vegetational Distribution of Termites of Rajasthan (India)

Termites
Insects described in 1902